Signe Elisabeth Lygre Førre (born 3 May 1994 in Voss, Norway) is a Norwegian singer, upright bassist, and composer.

Førre studies jazz at Voss Jazzskule. Her debut concert as band leader was at Vossajazz 2014 with Signe Førre Band. The lineup in addition to Førre, was saxophonist Elisabeth Lid Trøen, pianist Eivind Austad, and drummer Håkon Mjåset Johansen. In 2015 she played with the band Peace, Love and Swing, at Vossajazz, showing herself as composer. At the 2018 Vossajazz Førre appeared with her own trio playing a mixture of standards, her own compositions, and old folk tunes. The trio comprised additional pianist Erlend Slettevoll and drummer Håkon Mjåset Johansen.

Honors 
 2014: Awarded the UNGjaJAZZja by Vossajazz, with Signe Førre Band

References 

1994 births
Living people
21st-century Norwegian upright-bassists
Norwegian jazz upright-bassists
Jazz double-bassists
Norwegian women jazz singers
Norwegian jazz singers
Musicians from Voss
21st-century women musicians
21st-century Norwegian singers
21st-century Norwegian women singers